Miaoli Hills is an area of hills stretching across Miaoli County in north-central Taiwan. The hills lie to the south of Hsinchu Hills and to the north of Taichung. They extend from the Hsuehshan Mountain Range as part of foothills of the range, and adjoin the northwestern seacoast of Taiwan. The Hakka are a majority in this region.

See also
 Geography of Taiwan

Landforms of Taiwan
Hill lands
Landforms of Miaoli County
Hills of Asia